Belinda Claire De Camborne Lucy (born 15 October 1976) is a British former politician. She served as a Brexit Party Member of the European Parliament (MEP) for South East England from 2019 to 2020.

Early life
Belinda Claire De Camborne Lucy was born in Sheffield, South Yorkshire, on 15 October 1976. Her great-grandfather was Edward Selby Little, a missionary in China, and a co-founder of the resort town of Guling, Jiujiang. She reports that she can speak Mandarin.

Political career
She voted for Brexit in the 2016 United Kingdom European Union membership referendum and campaigned with the Leave Means Leave, and Ladies for Leave groups. In the 2019 European parliamentary election, De Lucy stood as a candidate for the Brexit Party in the South East England constituency. She was fourth on her party's list, and was elected as one of its four MEPs in the constituency. In the European Parliament, she was a member of the Committee on Women's Rights and Gender Equality, and part of the delegation to the EU–Russia Parliamentary Cooperation Committee.

Personal life
She is married to Raymond McKeeve and they have four children. McKeeve is a senior advisor at the legal firm Avonhurst, group chief transaction and legal officer at Cingo Global, and a part-time senior advisor and non-executive director at Azura Partners, and was previously a private equity specialist and corporate finance partner at the law firm Jones Day. Avonhurst was set up by a former Jones Day partner in July 2019. McKeeve had left Jones Day in 2020 after being accused of contempt of court. The charge stemmed from his instruction to one of the founders of Ocado to "burn" a messaging application after receiving a High Court search order in July 2019. He denied the charge but suggested that he had done so to protect his wife from potential litigation. She was a trustee of the charity Give Us Time, which was founded by former Secretary of State for Defence Liam Fox in 2012.

References

External links 
 European Parliament biography

1976 births
Living people
Brexit Party MEPs
MEPs for England 2019–2020
21st-century women MEPs for England
Politicians from London